Gojong is the temple name of several Korean monarchs.

It can refer to:
 Gojong of Goryeo (1195–1259)
 Gojong of Korea (1852–1919)

See also 
 Gaozong (disambiguation) (Chinese romanization)

Temple name disambiguation pages